The Plateau State House of Assembly is the legislative arm of the government  of Plateau State of Nigeria. It is a unicameral legislature with 24 members elected from the 17 local government areas of the state.  Local government areas with considerable lager population are delineated into two constituencies to give equal representation. This makes the number of legislators in the Plateau State House of Assembly 25.

The fundamental functions of the Assembly are to enact new laws, amend or repeal existing laws and oversight of the executive. Members of the assembly are elected for a term of four years concurrent with federal legislators (Senate and House of Representatives). The Legislators are known as Members of State House of Assembly. The state assembly convenes three times a week (Tuesdays, Wednesdays and Thursdays) in the assembly complex within the state capital, Jos.

The speaker of the 9th Plateau State House of Assembly Abok Ayuba was impeached and is currently replaced by Yakubu Yakson Sanda.

References 

Politics of Plateau State
State legislatures of Nigeria